Robin Walsh Leamy SM (27 July 1934 – 1 January 2022) was a New Zealand Roman Catholic prelate.

Biography
Born in Wellington to Cecil and Hazel Leamy, Leamy was one of five children. One of his sisters became a nun (Sister Patricia Leamy, Missionary Sisters of the Society of Mary). He was educated by the Brigidine Sisters and later by the Marist Fathers at St Patrick's College in Silverstream. He studied for the priesthood at the Marist Seminary in Greenmeadows, and was ordained on 21 July 1958.

Leamy served as Bishop of Rarotonga from 1984 to 1996. He resigned from that See on 8 November 1996 and was appointed Bishop Assistant and Vicar general of Auckland on that same day. He retired from that position in 2009 after 14 years' service. 

Leamy died in Auckland on 1 January 2022, at the age of 87.

References

1934 births
2022 deaths
20th-century Roman Catholic bishops in New Zealand
21st-century Roman Catholic bishops in New Zealand
Roman Catholic bishops in the Cook Islands
Religious leaders from Auckland
People from Wellington City
Marist Brothers
People educated at St. Patrick's College, Silverstream
New Zealand expatriates
New Zealand Roman Catholic bishops
Roman Catholic bishops of Rarotonga